The third and final season of Body of Proof, an American television series created by Christopher Murphey, aired in the United States from February 19, 2013 to May 28, 2013 and consisted of 13 episodes. It follows the life and career of Dr. Megan Hunt, a medical examiner, once a neurosurgeon, who now works in Philadelphia's Medical Examiner's office after a car accident ended her neurosurgery career.

On May 10, 2013, ABC canceled Body of Proof after three seasons. Immediately after the cancellation news, there were reports that the series might be picked up by a cable television network, with TNT, USA Network and WGN America all showing interest. On May 23, however, a rep for ABC Studios confirmed that Body of Proof would not move to a new network. Dana Delany confirmed that the May 28, 2013 season finale would also be the series finale with a Tweet: "Thank you to all who campaigned for #BodyOfProof4. 3rd most watched drama @abcnetwork thanks to you. I will miss Dr. Megan Hunt & Co. RIP."

Cast

Notes

Casting
In June 2012, it was announced that John Carroll Lynch, and Nicholas Bishop had chosen not to renew their contracts, and that they wouldn't be returning for another season. It was then announced that Sonja Sohn would not return to the series, as her character wasn't going to be asked back for another season. In August 2012, it was announced that Mark Valley was tapped to play the lead male detective in the new season, as Tommy Sullivan, a former love interest of Megan's. Just as it was announced that Mark Valley would be joining the series, it was announced that Elyes Gabel would be joining the cast as Adam Lucas, a new police detective and Tommy's partner. All other cast members, including Dana Delany, Jeri Ryan, Geoffrey Arend, Windell Middlebrooks and Mary Mouser, are expected to return in their series regular slots. Both Jeffrey Nordling and Joanna Cassidy are expected to remain as recurring characters throughout the season. In August 2012, it was announced that Annie Wersching had been cast as Yvonne Kurtz in a recurring role. Luke Perry reprises his Season 2 role as Charlie Stafford in multiple episodes, his character having now been promoted to county health commissioner. In September 2012, it was announced that Michael Nouri was to guest star in an episode as Daniel Russo, and that Ray Wise and Derek Webster are expected to guest star, while Tim DeKay had been cast in an unknown guest spot.

In October 2012, it was announced that Desperate Housewives actor Richard Burgi had been cast in a recurring role as Dan Russell, a Philadelphia DA who tries to convince Kate to run for political office. It was also reported that Charmed actor Ivan Sergei had been tapped to play Sergei, a potential love interest for Kate. It was also announced that Henry Ian Cusick is set to play Trent Marsh as a guest star. Tony Von Halle and Jenny Lin are both reported to have booked guest roles as Mark McDaniels and an Intern respectively. In November 2012, it was announced that Lorraine Toussaint had been cast as Angela Martin. In December 2012, it was reported that Brothers & Sisters star, Sarah Jane Morris, had been cast as a flight attendant named Pamela Jacks.

Development
Body of Proof was officially picked up for a third season with a 13 episode order, and was set to premiere sometime mid-season. In December 2012, it was announced that the season would premiere on February 5, 2013 on Tuesdays at 10pm. But in January 2013, it was announced that the premiere had been moved from February 5 to February 19, so that the network would be able to air all thirteen episodes in a row without being pre-empted by a speech that Barack Obama, the just-re-elected President of the United States, was slated to make on February 12. In January 2013, during an interview, it was announced that story-lines for the season would include Kate going into politics, and that Megan would be probing more deeply into her father's suicide, for which she would most likely get closure by the season finale.

Episodes

Ratings

Live ratings

Live + 7 Day (DVR) ratings

References

2013 American television seasons
3